Oydin Norboyeva, also known as Svetlana Norbaeva (b. 5 March 1944, Tashkent) is an Uzbek actress of theater and cinema, People's Artist of the Uzbek SSR (1979), Laureate of the State Prize of Uzbekistan (1989). She is best known for starring in “Rustam and Suhrab (1973), “Vesennyaya melodiya” (“The Spring Melody”) (1978), “The Gordin Cell” (2012). She was awarded the Lenin Komsomol Prize of Uzbekistan (1967) for playing the role of Nadia in the film "Don't Shoot at the 26th".

Life 
Oydin (Svetlana) Norboeva was born on 5 March 1944 in Tashkent, Uzbek SSR. Her father was a theater actor Hamza Abdulkhak Narbaev. In 1964, Norboeva graduated from the acting department of the Tashkent Theater and Art Institute named after A. Ostrovsky. While a student, she was accepted into the troupe of the Uzbek State Academic Drama Theater named after I. Hamza (1963), where she worked until 1990.

Career 
In 1964, Norboeva began acting in films with her first role of Suraya in Uchkun Nazarov's film “Suraya”. The next year, in 1965, she received a diploma “For a successful debut” of the film festival of the republics of Central Asia and Kazakhstan for this role. In 1966, Norboeva starred as Nadia in the firm “Don’t shoot at the 26th”. In 1967, she was awarded the Lenin Komsomol Prize of Uzbekistan for this role.

In 1973, Norboeva played a role of Tahmina in the film “Rustam and Suhrab”. The film was shot at “Tajikfilm”. In 1978, Norboyeva starred in the film “Vesennyaya melodiya” (“The Spring Melody”).

In 1979, she was awarded a title of People's Artist of the Uzbek SSR.

Since 1986, Norboeva combined her main work with work at the Ilkhom Theater of Mark Weil, and since 1990, she collaborated with the Academic Russian Drama Theater of Uzbekistan.

In total Norboeva has played over 50 roles in theater and cinema. Norboyeva starred in the films: "Obsessed" (Zamira), "Insight", “Don't shoot at the 26th” (Nadia), “You are my song” (Kamila), "The Legend of Rustam" and "Rustam and Suhrab" (Takhmina), "As the heart commands" (Khairi) and others.

Personal life 
Oydin Norboeva was married to the director Khabibulla Fayziev (born 1938) and the actor Bimbolat Vataev (1939-2000). Her son Dzhanik Fayziev is an actor, director and producer. Currently Norboeva lives in Tel Aviv, Israel.

Filmography (selected) 

 1964  - Life passed at night  - Suraya
 1965  - Obsessed  - Zamira
 1966  - Don't shoot on the 26th  - Nadia
 1968  - As the heart says  - Hyri
 1969  - Her name is Vesna  - Turakhanov's wife
 1971  - The Legend of Rustam  - Takhmina
 1971  - Rustam and Suhrab  - Takhmina
 1972  - At the very blue sky  - Iskander's mother
 1972  - Towards you  - Malakhat
 1975  - You, my song
 1976  - My older brother  - Razika
 1977  - It was in Kokand  - Fatima
 1978  - Clear Keys
 1979  - Gray breathing dragon / Des Drachens grauer Atem (GDR) - Bath Blake
 1981  - Provincial romance
 1983  - Family Secrets  - Firuza
 1991  - Cammy  - Camilla's mother
 2012  - The Gordin Cell  - Grandmother Nina (Nina Isaakovna)

References

External links 

 

1944 births
Living people
20th-century Uzbekistani actresses
Uzbekistani film actresses